"For a Good Time" is a song by Australian rock duo Divinyls, released in early 1997 as the final single from their fifth studio album Underworld.

"For a Good Time" was produced by Divinyls drummer Charley Drayton, who had produced much of the Underworld album. The song was written by Mark McEntee as well as the songwriting duo Billy Steinberg and Tom Kelly, who had both co-written past Divinyls hits such as "I'm Jealous", "I'm On Your Side" and most notably the band's signature hit "I Touch Myself".

Following the lack of success Underworld had, and the lack of chart success of the singles "Heart of Steel", "Human On the Inside" and "Hard On Me", "For a Good Time" peaked at #163 on the Australian ARIA singles chart.

"For a Good Time" also proved to be Divinyls last song prior to their unofficial disbandment. They would not return for another ten years when they released the compilation album Greatest Hits in 2006 and the comeback single "Don't Wanna Do This" in 2007.

Track listing
Australian CD Single
 "For a Good Time" - 5:06
 "For a Good Time" (Blackmarket Mix)
 "Save Me" - 5:36

Charts

References

1997 singles
Songs written by Billy Steinberg
Songs written by Tom Kelly (musician)
Divinyls songs
1997 songs
Songs written by Mark McEntee